Giuseppe Chiaretti (19 April 1933 – 2 December 2021) was an Italian Roman Catholic prelate. He was archbishop of Perugia–Città della Pieve (1995–2009).

Chiaretti was ordained a priest on 8 December 1955. From 1983 to 1986, he was bishop of Ripatransone-San Benedetto del Tronto and of Montalto. In 1986, both Dioceses were united to the Diocese of San Benedetto del Tronto-Ripatransone-Montalto. On 9 December 1995, Chiaretti was appointed archbishop of Perugia-Città della Pieve. He held this post until his retirement on 16 July 2009.

References

External links
 "Giuseppe Chiaretti" Catholic-Hierarchy.org. David M. Cheney. Retrieved December 4, 2021.

1933 births
2021 deaths
Italian Roman Catholic clergy
Bishops in Umbria
Roman Catholic archbishops in Italy
20th-century Italian Roman Catholic archbishops
21st-century Italian Roman Catholic archbishops
People from the Province of Rieti